The Chiayi Art Museum is an art museum in West District, Chiayi City, Taiwan.

History
The museum building was originally constructed in 1936 as a factory of the Chiayi branch of Taiwan Tobacco and Wine Monopoly Bureau during the Japanese rule of Taiwan. In November 2020, it was reopened as Chiayi Art Museum in an inaugurated ceremony by Mayor Huang Min-hui. On 27 January 2021, Eslite Bookstore opened a bookshop at the museum. The current director of the museum is Lai Yi-Hsin.

Architecture
The museum original factory building consisted of a main building and two warehouses. After it was turned into a museum, it consists of art spaces, library, shop, restaurant and garden. The museum was designed by M.H.Wang Architects and Associates and Studiobase Architects. It has a total floor area of 5,179 m2

Transportation
The museum is accessible within walking distance south of Chiayi Station of Taiwan Railways.

See also
 List of museums in Taiwan

References

External links

 

2020 establishments in Taiwan
Art museums and galleries in Taiwan
Industrial buildings completed in 1936
Museums established in 2020
Museums in Chiayi
West District